The Warunta River is a river in the Gracias a Dios Department of Honduras that flows into the Warunta Lagoon adjoining the larger Caratasca Lagoon, beside the Caribbean Sea.

See also
List of rivers of Honduras

References

Rivers of Honduras